Mikhail Kolesnikov may refer to:
 Mikhail Kolesnikov (politician) (1939–2007), former Russian Defense minister
 Mikhail Kolesnikov (footballer), Soviet and Russian footballer